Pete Sampras was the defending champion and won the final 3–6, 5–0 after Greg Rusedski was forced to retire.

Seeds
A champion seed is indicated in bold text while text in italics indicates the round in which that seed was eliminated.

  Pete Sampras (champion)
  Michael Chang (quarterfinals)
  Andre Agassi (semifinals)
  Todd Martin (semifinals)
 n/a
  Richey Reneberg (quarterfinals)
  Greg Rusedski (final)
  Chris Woodruff (quarterfinals)

Draw

References
 1997 Sybase Open Draw

SAP Open
1997 ATP Tour